Karaychevka is a rural locality (a selo) and the administrative center of Karaychevskoye Rural Settlement, Buturlinovsky District, Voronezh Oblast, Russia. The population was 860 as of 2010. There are 9 streets. Karaychevka is located 27 km northwest of Buturlinovka (the district's administrative centre) by road. Piramidy is the nearest rural locality.

References 

Rural localities in Buturlinovsky District